Fulham West was a borough constituency based in the London district of Fulham.  It was represented in the House of Commons of the Parliament of the United Kingdom from 1918 to 1955.

At the 1918 general election the previous Fulham constituency was divided into two constituencies, Fulham East and Fulham West; the two halves were re-united for the 1955 general election. At the 1997 general election, the Fulham constituency was replaced by Hammersmith and Fulham.

Boundaries
The Metropolitan Borough of Fulham wards of Hurlingham, Margravine, Munster, and Town.

Members of Parliament

Elections

Elections in the 1910s

Elections in the 1920s

Elections in the 1930s 

General Election 1939–40

Another General Election was required to take place before the end of 1940. The political parties had been making preparations for an election to take place and by the Autumn of 1939, the following candidates had been selected; 
Labour: Edith Summerskill
Conservative: 
British Union: Mercedes Barrington

Elections in the 1940s

Elections in the 1950s

References 

Parliamentary constituencies in London (historic)
Constituencies of the Parliament of the United Kingdom established in 1918
Constituencies of the Parliament of the United Kingdom disestablished in 1955
Fulham